The Woonsocket Speeders was the final moniker of the minor league baseball teams based in Woonsocket, Rhode Island. Between 1891 and 1933, Woonsocket teams played as members of the New England League from 1891 to 1892, Atlantic Association in 1908, Colonial League in 1914 and New England League in 1933. Woonsocket won the 1892 New England League championship. Woonsocket played as a minor league affiliate of the New York Giants in 1933.

History
In the 1891 season, Woonsocket first began minor league play, as the team joined the six–team Independent level New England League on June 10, 1891 during the season. The Lewiston franchise joined the league on the same day, as the league expanded to eight teams. The 1891 Woonsocket team finished with a 11–23 record, playing under manager Tom Rowe.

Woonsocket continued play in 1892, capturing the New England League championship in the eight–team Class B level league. The 1892 Woonsocket team ended the regular season with a 63–31 record to place 1st in the standings under player/manager Thomas O'Brien. Woonsocket finished 7.0 games ahead of 2nd place Portland in the final standings. Hi Ladd of Woonsocket led the New England League in total hits with 140 and teammate Tom O'Brien led the league with 106 runs. Despite winning the championship, the Woonsocket franchise folded from the New England League following the season.

The 1908 Woonsocket Trotters played very briefly as charter members of the short lived Class D level Atlantic Association. Woonsocket had a reported record of 0–1 when the team folded on May 4, 1909, after playing the one game under managers John Leighton and Buster Burrell. The entire league folded on May 21, 1908.

In 1914, the Woonsocket Speeders became charter members of the 1914 six–team Class C level Colonial League. The Fall River Spindles of the Colonial League ended the 1914 season with a record of 49–48, finishing 12.0 games behind the 1st place Fall River Spindles, as Roy Dickinson and Tom Walsh served as managers of the Woonsocket Speeders team. Joe Gaudette of Woonsocket led the league in hitting and total hits, batting .321 with 117 hits. The Woonsocket did not return to the 1915 Colonial League.

In 1933, "Woonsocket" returned to play during the season. On July 18, 1933, Woonsocket became members the Class B level New England League when the Lawrence Weavers moved to Woonsocket. If there was a team moniker in 1933 it is not referenced. Woonsocket played as a minor league affiliate of the New York Giants. The Woonsocket team finished with a record of 12–24 in Woonsocket and 27–50 overall, placing 6th in the final standings under manager Mark Devlin. It was reported that Skinny Graham hit .409 for the season, playing for the Lawrence/Woonsocket team. The Woonsocket franchise did not return to the 1934 New England League.

Woonsocket has not hosted another minor league team.

The ballpark
The name of the Woonsocket home minor league ballpark(s) is unknown.

Timeline

Year–by–year records

Notable alumni

Bob Barr (1892)
Buster Burrell (1892), (1908, MGR)
Frank Connaughton (1891–1892)
Skinny Graham (1933)
Joe Harrington (1892)
Hi Ladd (1892)
John Leighton (1892), (1908, MGR)
Sandy McDermott (1891)
Bill Merritt (1891)
Hugh Mulcahy (1933) MLB All-Star
Tom O'Brien (1892)
Frank Sexton (1891)
John Stafford (1891–1892)

See also
Woonsocket (minor league baseball) players

References

External links
Baseball Reference

Defunct minor league baseball teams
Defunct baseball teams in Rhode Island
Baseball teams established in 1914
New England League teams
Baseball teams disestablished in 1914
Colonial League teams